Mexico, Maryland may refer to:
Mexico, Allegany County, Maryland
Mexico, Carroll County, Maryland
New Mexico, Maryland
Oakwood, Maryland, formerly Mexico, Maryland in Cecil County